Camp Koehler was a 240-bed Level I work/medical camp located adjacent to Kinross Correctional Facility and was under there administration. Camp Koehler, which opened in 1988, included the Housing unit, a relatively new administration building, and an attached new Food Service building. The Administrative Building housed the offices of the Camp Assistant Deputy Warden and secretary and a visiting room which also functioned as a programming center. Approximately one quarter mile away was a building which housed the offices of Maintenance and Public Works departments.

A small compound, Camp Koehler had two separate yards and prisoner recreation areas located north of the buildings and connected by a pedestrian gate. The smaller yard contained a basketball and volleyball court, a weightlifting building, and various tables for leisure time activities. The larger yard area contained the horse-shoe activity areas and additional tables located in a grove of trees.

As of June 19, 2005, Camp Koehler had been converted to a housing unit and is now officially part of the Kinross Correctional Facility.

See also

 List of Michigan state prisons

Buildings and structures in Chippewa County, Michigan
Defunct prisons in Michigan
1988 establishments in Michigan
2005 disestablishments in Michigan